

Overview 
The first regular session of the 146th General Assembly of the U.S. state of Georgia met from Monday, January 8, 2001, at 10:00 am, to Friday, March 21, at 11:57 pm, at which time both houses adjourned sine die.  298 House bills and 97 Senate bills passed.

The second regular session of the Georgia General Assembly opened at 10:00 am on Monday, January 14, 2002, and adjourned sine die at 3:44pm on Friday, April 11, 2002.

Officers

Senate

Presiding Officer

Majority leadership

Minority leadership

House of Representatives

Presiding Officer

Majority leadership

Minority Leadership

Members of the Georgia State Senate, 2001–2002

Members of the Georgia State House of Representatives, 2001–2002 

Steve Stancil resigned in December 2001 to run for the position of Lt. Governor. A special election was held to fill the vacant seat. On February 12, 2002, Diane Z, Grasse won the special runoff election.

Legislation considered
Created Metropolitan North Georgia Water Planning District in 2001

References

Website of the 146th General Assembly of Georgia
Georgia House of Representatives Legislative Reports 2001-2002

Georgia (U.S. state) legislative sessions
2001 in American politics
2002 in American politics
2001 in Georgia (U.S. state)
2002 in Georgia (U.S. state)